Filippovia knipovitchi, the smooth hooked squid, is a species of squid in the family Onychoteuthidae and the sole member of the genus Filippovia. It is found in the Antarctic and Atlantic Oceans, and reaches a mantle length of 35 cm.

References

Bolstad, K.S.R. 2010. Systematics of the Onychoteuthidae Gray, 1847 (Cephalopoda: Oegopsida). Zootaxa 2696: 1–186. Preview

External links
 Tree of Life web project: Filippovia knipovitchi 

Squid
Molluscs described in 1972